Norway competed at the 2022 World Aquatics Championships in Budapest, Hungary from 17 June to 3 July.

Diving

Norway's diving team consisted of 2 athletes (2 female).

Women

Swimming

Norway entered three swimmers.

Men

References

Nations at the 2022 World Aquatics Championships
Norway at the World Aquatics Championships
2022 in Norwegian sport